Cardona is a Spanish/Catalan surname. Notable people with the surname include:

Andrea Cardona (born 1982), Guatemalan mountain climber
Benjamín Cardona (born 1957), Colombian footballer
Carlos Cardona (born 1974), Colombian businessman
Edwin Cardona (born 1992), Colombian footballer
George Cardona, American linguist and Indologist
Germán Cardona Gutiérrez (born 1956), Colombian politician
Jaime Cardona (died 1466), Spanish cardinal
Javier Cardona (born 1975), American baseball player
José Cardona (1939–2013), Honduran footballer
José Miró Cardona (1902–1974), Cuban politician
Juan Carlos Cardona (born 1974), Colombian long-distance runner
Julian Cardona (born 1990), Puerto Rican footballer
Julián Cardona, Colombian cyclist
Hélène Cardona, Poet, linguist, literary translator and actor
Leonardo Cardona (born 1971), Colombian cyclist
Manuel Cardona (1974-2014), Spanish physicist
Manolo Cardona (born 1977), Colombian actor
Marcel Cardona, Belizean politician
Maria de Cardona (1509-1563), Italian noblewoman
María de los Angeles Cardona (1940-1991), Spanish biologist
Mark Cardona (born 1981), Filipino basketball player
Matt Cardona (born 1985), American professional wrestler
Milton Cardona, Puerto Rican musician
Paul Cardona (born 1953), Gozitan priest
Pepe Cardona (died 2020), American pop-rock singer, member of the band Alive 'N Kickin'
Prudencio Cardona (1951–2019), Colombian boxer
René Cardona Jr. (1939–2003), Mexican film director and actor
Ricardo Cardona (chef), American chef
Ricardo Cardona (boxer) (1952–2015), Colombian boxer
Robert D. Cardona (born 1930), American writer
Salvador Cardona (1901–1985), Spanish cyclist
Santos Cardona (1974–2009), United States Army soldier
Trinidad Cardona (born 1999), American singer and songwriter
Virginia Cardona (born 1967), Spanish volleyball player

Spanish-language surnames
Catalan-language surnames